Revúca (formerly Veľká Revúca  in Slovak;) is a town in Banská Bystrica Region, Slovakia. Revúca is the seat of Revúca District.

Etymology
The name is of Slovak origin and was initially the name of Revúca Creek (literally, 'roaring'). The same names can be found also in Liptov (Liptovské Revúce formerly Revúca and the Revúca River).

History
The earliest written record of the existence of the town is from 1357. The iron industry was developing for more than 500 years. During the second half of the 19th century, Revúca became a centre of Slovak national revival. The first high school teaching in Slovak was founded in Revúca in 1862, but it was closed down by the Hungarian authorities in 1874 (see Magyarization). Both the original building of the high school (with the historical exposition) and the new building are the National Cultural Monuments. During the short period of its existence, the high school attracted many activists, writers, and politicians (Štefan Marko Daxner, Ján Francisci, Július Botto, Samuel Ormis, August Horislav Škultéty, Ivan Branislav Zoch) to the town.

Landmarks
The late Gothic Roman Catholic church of Saint Lawrence has a deacon built in the second half of the 15th century and a pre-built tower. Originally, the church had two towers, but the lower one was dismantled after the fire in 1892. The main, pseudo-Gothic altar is decorated by table pictures depicting scenes from the life of Saint Quirin dated to about 1500.

Evangelic Classical Lutheran Church, a cultural monument. It was built 
in 1784–1785, the tower was built later in 1788. A commemorative board on 
the church is dedicated to the Slovak Lutheran grammar school- The first 
Slovak grammar school that was opened on September 16, 1862.

Surroundings
Revúca is a trailhead of several hiking trails leading to the Muránska planina National Park. Muráň Castle and Ochtiná Aragonite Cave are just a short drive from the town.

Demographics
Revúca has a population of 13,098 (as of December 31, 2005). According to the 2001 census, 92.1% of inhabitants were Slovaks, 4.1 Romani, and 2.2% Hungarians. The religious makeup was 39.4% Roman Catholics, 34.5% people with no religious affiliation, and 19.8% Lutherans.

Notable people
Norbert Gyömbér – Slovak international football player
Gyula Rochlitz – architect, designer of Budapest's Keleti Pályaudvar (Eastern Railway Station)
Rudolf Viest – General, commander-in-chief in the Slovak National Uprising
Andrej Danko (born 1974) – Slovak lawyer, speaker of the National Council, and leading member of Slovak National Party
 Samuel Reuss – Lutheran pastor

Twin towns — Sister cities

Revúca is twinned with:

 Lędziny, Poland
 Kazincbarcika, Hungary
 Litovel, Czech Republic
 Pakrac, Croatia
 Selca, Croatia
 Lipik, Croatia

References

External links
http://www.revuca.sk/ 

Cities and towns in Slovakia